In American politics, the Southern strategy was a Republican Party electoral strategy to increase political support among white voters in the South by appealing to racism against African Americans. As the civil rights movement and dismantling of Jim Crow laws in the 1950s and 1960s visibly deepened existing racial tensions in much of the Southern United States, Republican politicians such as presidential candidate Richard Nixon and Senator Barry Goldwater developed strategies that successfully contributed to the political realignment of many white, conservative voters in the South who had traditionally supported the Democratic Party. It also helped to push the Republican Party much more to the right relative to the 1950s.

The phrase "Southern Strategy" refers primarily to "top down" narratives of the political realignment of the South which suggest that Republican leaders consciously appealed to many white Southerners' racial grievances to gain their support. This top-down narrative of the Southern Strategy is generally believed to be the primary force that transformed Southern politics following the civil rights era. The scholarly consensus is that racial conservatism was critical in the post-Civil Rights Act realignment of the Republican and Democratic parties, though several aspects of this view have been debated by historians and political scientists.

The perception that the Republican Party had served as the "vehicle of white supremacy in the South," particularly during the Goldwater campaign and the presidential elections of 1968 and 1972, made it difficult for the Republican Party to win back the support of black voters in the South in later years. In 2005, Republican National Committee chairman Ken Mehlman formally apologized to the National Association for the Advancement of Colored People (NAACP) for exploiting racial polarization to win elections and for ignoring the black vote.

Introduction
Although the phrase "Southern Strategy" is often attributed to Nixon's political strategist Kevin Phillips, he did not originate it but popularized it. In an interview included in a 1970 New York Times article, Phillips stated his analysis based on studies of ethnic voting:

While Phillips sought to increase Republican power by polarizing ethnic voting in general, and not just to win the white South, the South was by far the biggest prize yielded by his approach. Its success began at the presidential level. Gradually, Southern voters began to elect Republicans to Congress and finally to statewide and local offices, particularly as some legacy segregationist Democrats retired or switched to the GOP. In addition, the Republican Party worked for years to develop grassroots political organizations across the South, supporting candidates for local school boards and city and county offices as examples, but following the Watergate scandal Southern voters came out in support for the "favorite son" candidate, Southern Democrat Jimmy Carter.

From 1948 to 1984, the Southern states, for decades a stronghold for the Democrats, became key swing states, providing the popular vote margins in the 1960, 1968 and 1976 elections. During this era, several Republican candidates expressed support for states' rights, a reversal of the position held by Republicans prior to the Civil War. Some political analysts said this term was used in the 20th century as a "code word" to represent opposition to federal enforcement of civil rights for blacks and to federal intervention on their behalf; many individual southerners had opposed passage of the Voting Rights Act.

Background

20th-century Reconstruction to Solid South

During the Reconstruction era (1863–1877), the Republican Party built up its base across the South and for a while had control in each state except Virginia, but from a national perspective, the Republican Party always gave priority to its much better established Northern state operations. The Northern party distrusted the scalawags, found the carpetbaggers distasteful and lacked respect for the black component of their Republican Party in the South. Richard Abbott says that national Republicans always "stressed building their Northern base rather than extending their party into the South, and whenever the Northern and Southern needs conflicted the latter always lost". In 1868, the GOP spent only 5% of its war chest in the South. Ulysses S. Grant was reelected and the New York Tribune advised it was now time for Southern Republicans to "root, hog, or die!" (that is, to take care of themselves).

During the 1876 United States presidential election, the GOP ticket headed by moderates Rutherford B. Hayes and William A. Wheeler (later known as members of the comparably liberal "Half-Breed" faction) abandoned the party's pro-civil rights efforts of Reconstruction and made conciliatory tones to the South in the form of appeals to old Southern Whigs.

In a series of compromises, such as the Compromise of 1877, the Republican Party withdrew United States Army forces that had propped up its last three state governors and in return gained the White House for Rutherford B. Hayes. All the Southern states were now under the control of Democrats, who decade by decade increased their control of virtually all aspects of politics in the ex-Confederate states. There were occasional pockets of Republican control, usually in remote mountain districts.

After 1890, the white Democrats used a variety of tactics to reduce voting by African Americans and poor whites. In the 1880s, they began to pass legislation making election processes more complicated and in some cases requiring payment of poll taxes, which created a barrier for poor people of both races.

From 1890 to 1908, the white Democratic legislatures in every Southern state enacted new constitutions or amendments with provisions to disenfranchise most blacks and tens of thousands of poor whites. Provisions required payment of poll taxes, complicated residency, literacy tests and other requirements which were subjectively applied against blacks. As blacks lost their vote, the Republican Party lost its ability to effectively compete in the South. There was a dramatic drop in voter turnout as these measures took effect, a decline in African American participation that was enforced for decades in all Southern states.

Blacks did have a voice in the Republican Party, especially in the choice of presidential candidates at the national convention. Boris Heersink and Jeffery A. Jenkins argue that in 1880–1928 Republican leaders at the presidential level adopted a "Southern Strategy" by "investing heavily in maintaining a minor party organization in the South, as a way to create a reliable voting base at conventions". As a consequence, federal patronage did go to Southern blacks as long as there was a Republican in the White House. The issue exploded in 1912, when President William Howard Taft used control of the Southern delegations to defeat former President Theodore Roosevelt at the Republican National Convention.

Because blacks were closed out of elected offices, the South's congressional delegations and state governments were dominated by white Democrats until the 1980s or later.  Effectively, Southern white Democrats controlled all the votes of the expanded population by which Congressional apportionment was figured. Many of their representatives achieved powerful positions of seniority in Congress, giving them control of chairmanships of significant Congressional committees. Although the Fourteenth Amendment has a provision to reduce the Congressional representation of states that denied votes to their adult male citizens, this provision was never enforced. Because African Americans could not be voters, they were also prevented from being jurors and serving in local offices. Services and institutions for them in the segregated South were chronically underfunded by state and local governments, from which they were excluded.

During this period, Republicans held only a few House seats from the South. Between 1880 and 1904, Republican presidential candidates in the South received 35–40% of that section's vote (except in 1892, when the 16% for the Populists knocked Republicans down to 25%). From 1904 to 1948, Republicans received more than 30% of the section's votes only in the 1920 (35.2%, carrying Tennessee) and 1928 elections (47.7%, carrying five states) after disenfranchisement.

During this period, Republican administrations appointed blacks to political positions. Republicans regularly supported anti-lynching bills, but these were filibustered by Southern Democrats in the Senate. In the 1928 election, the Republican candidate Herbert Hoover rode the issues of prohibition and anti-Catholicism to carry five former Confederate states, with 62 of the 126 electoral votes of the section. After his victory, Hoover attempted to build up the Republican Party of the South, transferring his limited patronage away from blacks and toward the same kind of white Protestant businessmen who made up the core of the Northern Republican Party. With the onset of the Great Depression, which severely affected the South, Hoover soon became extremely unpopular. The gains of the Republican Party in the South were lost. In the 1932 election, Hoover received only 18.1% of the Southern vote for re-election.

World War II and population changes
In the 1948 election, after President Harry S. Truman signed Executive Order 9981 to desegregate the military, a group of conservative Southern Democrats known as Dixiecrats split from the Democratic Party in reaction to the inclusion of a civil rights plank in the party's platform. This followed a floor fight led by civil-rights activist, Minneapolis Mayor (and soon-to-be Senator) Hubert Humphrey. The disaffected conservative Democrats formed the States' Rights Democratic, or Dixiecrat Party and nominated Governor Strom Thurmond of South Carolina for President. Thurmond carried four Deep South states in the general election: South Carolina, Alabama, Mississippi and Louisiana. The main plank of the States' Rights Democratic Party was maintaining segregation and Jim Crow in the South. The Dixiecrats, failing to deny the Democrats the presidency in 1948, soon dissolved, but the split lingered. In the fall of 1964, Thurmond was one of the first conservative Southern Democrats to switch to the Republican Party just a couple months after Democratic President Lyndon B. Johnson signed the Civil Rights Act into law.

In addition to the splits in the Democratic Party, the population movements associated with World War II had a significant effect in changing the demographics of the South. Starting during World War II, lasting from 1940 to 1970, more than 5 million African-Americans moved from the rural South to medium and major Northern industrial cities as well as mainly coastal munitions centers of the West during the Second Great Migration for jobs in the defense industry and later economic opportunities during the post-World War II economic boom.

With control of powerful committees, Southern Democrats gained new federal military installations in the South and other federal investments during and after the war. Changes in industry and growth in universities and the military establishment in turn attracted Northern transplants to the South and bolstered the base of the Republican Party. In the post-war presidential campaigns, Republicans did best in those fastest-growing states of the South that had the most Northern transplants. In the 1952, 1956 and 1960 elections, Virginia, Tennessee and Florida went Republican while Louisiana went Republican in 1956 and Texas twice voted for Dwight D. Eisenhower and once for John F. Kennedy. In 1956, Eisenhower received 48.9% of the Southern vote, becoming only the second Republican in history (after Ulysses S. Grant) to get a plurality of Southern votes.

The white conservative voters of the states of the Deep South remained loyal to the Democratic Party, which had not officially repudiated segregation. Because of declines in population or smaller rates of growth compared to other states, Mississippi, Alabama, Arkansas and North Carolina lost congressional seats from the 1950s to the 1970s while South Carolina, Louisiana and Georgia remained static. Eisenhower was elected president in 1952, with strong support from the emerging middle class suburban element in the South. He appointed a number of Southern Republican supporters as federal judges in the South. They in turn ordered the desegregation of Southern schools in the 1950s and 1960s. They included Fifth Circuit Court of Appeals judges John R. Brown, Elbert P. Tuttle and John Minor Wisdom as well as district judges Frank Johnson and J. Skelly Wright. However, five of his 24 appointees supported segregation.

Roots (1961–1972)
In the early 1960s, leading Republicans including Senator Barry Goldwater began advocating for a plan they called the Southern Strategy, an effort to make Republican gains in the Solid South, which had been pro-Democratic since the American Civil War. Under the Southern Strategy, Republicans would continue an earlier effort to make inroads in the South, Operation Dixie, by ending attempts to appeal to African American voters in the Northern states, and instead appeal to white conservative voters in the South. As documented by reporters and columnists including Joseph Alsop and  Arthur Krock, on the surface the Southern Strategy would appeal to white voters in the South by advocating against the New Frontier programs of President John F. Kennedy and in favor of a smaller federal government and states' rights, while less publicly arguing against the Civil Rights movement and in favor of continued racial segregation.

Congressman and Republican National Committee chairman William E. Miller concurred with Goldwater and backed the Southern Strategy, including holding private meetings of the RNC and other key Republican leaders in late 1962 and early 1963 so they could decide whether to implement it. Overruling the moderate and liberal wings of the party, its leadership decided to pursue the Southern Strategy for the 1964 elections and beyond.

The "Year of Birmingham" in 1963 highlighted racial issues in Alabama. Through the spring, there were marches and demonstrations to end legal segregation. The Movement's achievements in settlement with the local business class were overshadowed by bombings and murders by the Ku Klux Klan, most notoriously in the deaths of four girls in the 16th Street Baptist Church bombing.

After Democrat George Wallace was elected Governor of Alabama, he emphasized the connection between states' rights and segregation, both in speeches and by creating crises to provoke federal intervention.  He opposed integration at the University of Alabama and collaborated with the Ku Klux Klan in 1963 in disrupting court-ordered integration of public schools in Birmingham.

Many states' rights Democrats were attracted to Goldwater's 1964 presidential campaign. Goldwater was notably more conservative than previous Republican nominees, such as President Eisenhower. Goldwater's principal opponent in the primary election, Governor Nelson Rockefeller of New York, was widely seen as representing the more moderate, pro-Civil Rights Act, Northern wing of the party (see Rockefeller Republican and Goldwater Republican).

In the 1964 presidential election, Goldwater ran a conservative, hawkish campaign that broadly opposed strong action by the federal government. Although he had supported all previous federal civil rights legislation, Goldwater opposed the Civil Rights Act and championed this opposition during the campaign. He believed that this act was an intrusion of the federal government into the affairs of state; and second, that the Act interfered with the rights of private persons to do business, or not, with whomever they chose, even if the choice is based on racial discrimination.

Goldwater's position appealed to white Southern Democrats and Goldwater was the first Republican presidential candidate since Reconstruction to win the electoral votes of the Deep South states (Louisiana, Georgia, Alabama, Mississippi and South Carolina). Outside the South, Goldwater's negative vote on the Civil Rights Act proved devastating to his campaign. The only other state he won was his home one of Arizona and he suffered a landslide defeat. A Lyndon B. Johnson ad called "Confessions of a Republican", which ran in Northern and Western states, associated Goldwater with the Ku Klux Klan. At the same time, Johnson's campaign in the Deep South publicized Goldwater's support for pre-1964 civil rights legislation. In the end, Johnson swept the election.

At the time, Goldwater was at odds in his position with most of the prominent members of the Republican Party, dominated by so-called Eastern Establishment and Midwestern Progressives. A higher percentage of the Republicans and Democrats outside the South supported the Civil Rights Act of 1964, as they had on all previous Civil Rights legislation. The Southern Democrats mostly opposed the Northern and Western politicians regardless of party affiliation—and their Presidents (Kennedy and Johnson)—on civil rights issues. At the same time, passage of the Civil Rights Act caused many black voters to join the Democratic Party, which moved the party and its nominees in a progressive direction.

Johnson was concerned that his endorsement of Civil Rights legislation would endanger his party in the South. In the 1968 election, Richard Nixon saw the cracks in the Solid South as an opportunity to tap into a group of voters who had historically been beyond the reach of the Republican Party. George Wallace had exhibited a strong candidacy in that election, where he garnered 46 electoral votes and nearly 10 million popular votes, attracting mostly Southern Democrats away from Hubert Humphrey.

The notion of Black Power advocated by the Student Nonviolent Coordinating Committee leaders captured some of the frustrations of African Americans at the slow process of change in gaining civil rights and social justice. African Americans pushed for faster change, raising racial tensions. Journalists reporting about the demonstrations against the Vietnam War often featured young people engaging in violence or burning draft cards and American flags. Conservatives were also dismayed about the many young adults engaged in the drug culture and "free love" (sexual promiscuity), in what was called the "hippie" counter-culture. These actions scandalized many Americans and created a concern about law and order.

Nixon's advisers recognized that they could not appeal directly to voters on issues of white supremacy or racism. White House Chief of Staff H. R. Haldeman noted that Nixon "emphasized that you have to face the fact that the whole problem is really the blacks. The key is to devise a system that recognized this while not appearing to". With the aid of Harry Dent and South Carolina Senator Strom Thurmond, who had switched to the Republican Party in 1964, Nixon ran his 1968 campaign on states' rights and "law and order". Liberal Northern Democrats accused Nixon of pandering to Southern whites, especially with regard to his "states' rights" and "law and order" positions, which were widely understood by black leaders to symbolize Southern resistance to civil rights. This tactic was described in 2007 by David Greenberg in Slate as "dog-whistle politics". According to an article in The American Conservative, Nixon adviser and speechwriter Pat Buchanan disputed this characterization.

The independent candidacy of George Wallace, former Democratic governor of Alabama, partially negated Nixon's Southern Strategy. With a much more explicit attack on integration and black civil rights, Wallace won all of Goldwater's states (except South Carolina) as well as Arkansas and one of North Carolina's electoral votes. Nixon picked up Virginia, Tennessee, North Carolina, South Carolina and Florida while Democratic nominee Hubert Humphrey won only Texas in the South. Writer Jeffrey Hart, who worked on the Nixon campaign as a speechwriter, said in 2006 that Nixon did not have a "Southern Strategy", but "Border State Strategy" as he said that the 1968 campaign ceded the Deep South to George Wallace. Hart suggested that the press called it a "Southern Strategy" as they are "very lazy".

By contrast, in the 1972 election Nixon won every state in the Union except Massachusetts, winning more than 70% of the popular vote in most of the Deep South (Mississippi, Alabama, Georgia, Florida, and South Carolina) and 61% of the national vote. He won more than 65% of the votes in the other states of the former Confederacy and 18% of the black vote nationwide. Despite his appeal to Southern whites, Nixon was widely perceived as a moderate outside the South and won African American votes on that basis.

Glen Moore argues that in 1970 Nixon and the Republican Party developed a "Southern Strategy" for the midterm elections. The strategy involved depicting Democratic candidates as permissive liberals. Republicans thereby managed to unseat Albert Gore, Sr. of Tennessee as well as Senator Joseph D. Tydings of Maryland. However, for the entire region the net result was a small loss of seats for the Republican Party in the South.

Regional attention in 1970 focused on the Senate, when Nixon nominated Judge G. Harrold Carswell of Florida, a judge on the Fifth Circuit Court of Appeals to the Supreme Court. Carswell was a lawyer from north Florida with a mediocre record, but Nixon needed a Southerner and a "strict constructionist" to support his "Southern Strategy" of moving the region toward the GOP. Carswell was voted down by the liberal block in the Senate, causing a backlash that pushed many Southern Democrats into the Republican fold. The long-term result was a realization by both parties that nominations to the Supreme Court could have a major impact on political attitudes in the South.

In a year-by-year analysis of how the transformation took place in the critical state of Virginia, James Sweeney shows that the slow collapse of the old statewide Byrd machine gave the Republicans the opportunity to build local organizations county by county and city by city. The Democratic Party factionalized, with each faction having the goal of taking over the entire statewide Byrd machine, but the Byrd leadership was basically conservative and more in line with the national Republican Party in economic and foreign policy issues.  Republicans united behind A. Linwood Holton, Jr. in 1969 and swept the state. In the 1970 Senate elections, the Byrd machine made a comeback by electing Independent Harry Flood Byrd, Jr. over Republican Ray L. Garland and Democrat George Rawlings. The new Senator Byrd never joined the Republican Party and instead joined the Democratic caucus. Nevertheless, he had a mostly conservative voting record especially on the trademark Byrd issue of the national deficit. At the local level, the 1970s saw steady Republican growth with this emphasis on a middle-class suburban electorate that had little interest in the historic issues of rural agrarianism and racial segregation.

Evolution (1970s and 1980s)

As civil rights grew more accepted throughout the nation, basing a general election strategy on appeals to "states' rights", which some would have believed opposed civil rights laws, would have resulted in a national backlash. The concept of "states' rights" was considered by some to be subsumed within a broader meaning than simply a reference to civil rights laws. States rights became seen as encompassing a type of New Federalism that would return local control of race relations. Republican strategist Lee Atwater discussed the Southern Strategy in a 1981 interview later published in Southern Politics in the 1990s by Alexander P. Lamis.

Reagan's Neshoba County Fair "states' rights" speech 

In August 1980, Republican candidate Ronald Reagan made a much-noted appearance at the Neshoba County Fair in Philadelphia, Mississippi, where his speech contained the phrase "I believe in states' rights". This was cited as evidence that the Republican Party was building upon the Southern strategy again. Former UN Ambassador Andrew Young, an African-American, charged that with his support of states' rights, Reagan was signaling that "it’s going to be all right to kill niggers when [Reagan is] president." This remark was criticized by Carter's White House. Two days after his appearance at the Neshoba County Fair, Reagan appeared at the Urban League convention in New York to appeal to black voters, where he said, "I am committed to the protection and enforcement of the civil rights of black Americans. This commitment is interwoven into every phase of the plans I will propose."

Reagan's campaigns used racially coded rhetoric, making attacks on the "welfare state" and leveraging resentment towards affirmative action. Dan Carter explains how "Reagan showed that he could use coded language with the best of them, lambasting welfare queens, busing, and affirmative action as the need arose". During his 1976 and 1980 campaigns, Reagan employed stereotypes of welfare recipients, often invoking the case of a "welfare queen" with a large house and a Cadillac using multiple names to collect over $150,000 in tax-free income. Aistrup described Reagan's campaign statements as "seemingly race neutral", but explained how whites interpret this in a racial manner, citing a Democratic National Committee funded study conducted by Communications Research Group. Though Reagan did not overtly mention the race of the welfare recipient, the unstated impression in whites' minds were black people and Reagan's rhetoric resonated with Southern white perceptions of black people.

Aistrup argued that one example of Reagan field-testing coded language in the South was a reference to an unscrupulous man using food stamps as a "strapping young buck". When informed of the offensive connotations of the term, Reagan defended his actions as a nonracial term that was common in his Illinois hometown. Ultimately, Reagan never used that particular phrasing again. According to Ian Haney Lopez, the "young buck" term changed into "young fellow" which was less overtly racist: Some young fellow' was less overtly racist and so carried less risk of censure, and worked just as well to provoke a sense of white victimization".

Lee Atwater argued that Reagan did not use the Southern strategy or need to make racial appeals:

Atwater: But Reagan did not have to do a southern strategy for two reasons. Number one, race was not a dominant issue. And number two, the mainstream issues in this campaign had been, quote, southern issues since way back in the sixties. So Reagan goes out and campaigns on the issues of economics and of national defense. The whole campaign was devoid of any kind of racism, any kind of reference.

Willie Horton attack ads

During the 1988 presidential election, the Willie Horton attack ads run against Democratic candidate Michael Dukakis built upon the Southern Strategy in a campaign that reinforced the notion that Republicans best represent conservative whites with traditional values. Lee Atwater and Roger Ailes worked on the campaign as George H. W. Bush's political strategists. Upon seeing a favorable New Jersey focus group response to the Horton strategy, Atwater recognized that an implicit racial appeal could work outside of the Southern states. The subsequent ads featured Horton's mugshot and played on fears of black criminals. Atwater said of the strategy: "By the time we're finished, they're going to wonder whether Willie Horton is Dukakis' running mate". Al Gore was the first to use the Willie Horton prison furlough against Dukakis and—like the Bush campaign—would not mention race. The Bush campaign claimed they were initially made aware of the Horton issue via the Gore campaign's use of the subject. Bush initially hesitated to use the Horton campaign strategy, but the campaign saw it as a wedge issue to harm Dukakis who was struggling against Democratic rival Jesse Jackson.

In addition to presidential campaigns, subsequent Republican campaigns for the House of Representatives and Senate in the South employed the Southern Strategy. During his 1990 re-election campaign, Jesse Helms attacked his opponent's alleged support of "racial quotas", most notably through an ad in which a white person's hands are seen crumpling a letter indicating that he was denied a job because of the color of his skin.

New York Times opinion columnist Bob Herbert wrote in 2005: "The truth is that there was very little that was subconscious about the G.O.P.'s relentless appeal to racist whites. Tired of losing elections, it saw an opportunity to renew itself by opening its arms wide to white voters who could never forgive the Democratic Party for its support of civil rights and voting rights for blacks". Aistrup described the transition of the Southern Strategy saying that it has "evolved from a states' rights, racially conservative message to one promoting in the Nixon years, vis-à-vis the courts, a racially conservative interpretation of civil rights laws—including opposition to busing. With the ascendancy of Reagan, the Southern Strategy became a national strategy that melded race, taxes, anticommunism, and religion".

Some analysts viewed the 1990s as the apogee of Southernization or the Southern Strategy, given that the Democratic President Bill Clinton and Vice President Al Gore were from the South as were Congressional leaders on both sides of the aisle. During the end of Nixon's presidency, the Senators representing the former Confederate states in the 93rd Congress were primarily Democrats. During the beginning of Bill Clinton's presidency twenty years later in the 103rd Congress, this was still the case.

Role of churches
Certain denominations show strong preferences, by membership, for certain political parties, particularly evangelicals for the GOP and historically black churches for the Democratic Party, and voter guides exist, either designed for distribution by churches or easily available for that. As a consequence, churches have played a key role in support of the Southern strategy, especially Southern Baptists. Black Baptists, on the other hand, served as a source of resistance to Jim Crow through parallel institutions, intellectual traditions, and activism which extend into the present day.

Shifts in strategy (1990s and 2000s)
In the mid-1990s, the Republican Party made major attempts to court African American voters, believing that the strength of religious values within the African American community and the growing number of affluent and middle-class African Americans would lead this group increasingly to support Republican candidates. In general, these efforts did not significantly increase African American support for the Republican Party. Few African Americans voted for George W. Bush and other national Republican candidates in the 2004 elections, although he attracted a higher percentage of black voters (15%) to identify as Republican than had any GOP candidate since Dwight D. Eisenhower (24%). In his article "The Race Problematic, the Narrative of Martin Luther King Jr., and the Election of Barack Obama", Dr. Rickey Hill argued that Bush implemented his own Southern Strategy by exploiting "the denigration of the liberal label to convince white conservatives to vote for him. Bush's appeal was to the same racist tropes that had been used since the Goldwater and Nixon days."

Following Bush's re-election, Ken Mehlman, Bush's campaign manager and Chairman of the Republican National Committee, held several large meetings in 2005 with African American business, community and religious leaders. In his speeches, he apologized for his party's use of the Southern Strategy in the past. When asked about the strategy of using race as an issue to build GOP dominance in the once-Democratic South, Mehlman replied,

Republican candidates often have prospered by ignoring black voters and even by exploiting racial tensions [...] by the '70s and into the '80s and '90s, the Democratic Party solidified its gains in the African-American community, and we Republicans did not effectively reach out. Some Republicans gave up on winning the African-American vote, looking the other way or trying to benefit politically from racial polarization. I am here today as the Republican chairman to tell you we were wrong.

Thomas Edge argues that the election of President Barack Obama saw a new type of Southern Strategy emerge among conservative voters. They used his election as evidence of a post-racial era to deny the need of continued civil rights legislation while simultaneously playing on racial tensions and marking him as a "racial bogeyman". Edge described three parts to this phenomenon saying:

First, according to the arguments, a nation that has the ability to elect a Black president is completely free of racism. Second, attempts to continue the remedies enacted after the civil rights movement will only result in more racial discord, demagoguery, and racism against White Americans. Third, these tactics are used side-by-side with the veiled racism and coded language of the original Southern Strategy.

Other observers have suggested that the election of President Obama in the 2008 presidential election and subsequent re-election in 2012 signaled the growing irrelevance of the Southern Strategy-style tactics. Louisiana State University political scientists Wayne Parent, for example, suggested that Obama's ability to get elected without the support of Southern states demonstrate that the region was moving from "the center of the political universe to being an outside player in presidential politics" while University of Maryland, Baltimore County political scientist Thomas Schaller argued that the Republican party had "marginalized" itself, becoming a "mostly regional party" through a process of Southernization.

Scholarly debates
The Southern strategy is generally believed to be the primary force that transformed the "Democratic South into a reliable GOP stronghold in presidential elections". Scholars generally emphasize the role of racial backlash in the realignment of southern voters. The viewpoint that the electoral realignment of the Republican party due to a race-driven Southern Strategy is also known as the "top-down" viewpoint. Most scholarship and analysts support this top-down viewpoint and state that the political shift was due primarily to racial issues.  Some historians believe that racial issues took a back seat to a grassroots narrative known as the "suburban strategy", which Glen Feldman calls a "dissenting—yet rapidly growing—narrative on the topic of southern partisan realignment".

Matthew Lassiter says: "A suburban-centered vision reveals that demographic change played a more important role than racial demagoguery in the emergence of a two-party system in the American South". Lassiter argues that race-based appeals cannot explain the GOP shift in the South while also noting that the real situation is far more complex. According to Lassiter, political scientists and historians point out that the timing does not fit the "Southern Strategy" model. Nixon carried 49 states in 1972, so he operated a successful national rather than regional strategy. But the Republican Party remained quite weak at the local and state level across the entire South for decades.

Bruce Kalk and George Tindall argue that Nixon's Southern Strategy was to find a compromise on race that would take the issue out of politics, allowing conservatives in the South to rally behind his grand plan to reorganize the national government. Kalk and Tindall emphasize the similarity between Nixon's operations and the series of compromises orchestrated by Rutherford B. Hayes in 1877 that ended the battles over Reconstruction and put Hayes in the White House. Kalk says Nixon did end the reform impulse and sowed the seeds for the political rise of white Southerners and the decline of the civil rights movement.

Dean Kotlowski argues that Nixon's overall civil rights record was on the whole responsible and that Nixon tended to seek the middle ground. He campaigned as a moderate in 1968, pitching his appeal to the widest range of voters. Furthermore, he continued this strategy as president. As a matter of principle, says Kotlowski, he supported integration of schools. However, Nixon chose not to antagonize Southerners who opposed it and left enforcement to the judiciary, which had originated the issue in the first place. In particular, Kotlowski believes historians have been somewhat misled by Nixon's rhetorical Southern Strategy that had limited influence on actual policies.

Nicholas Valentino and David O. Sears conducted their own study and reported that "the South's shift to the Republican party has been driven to a significant degree by racial conservatism" and also concluded that "racial conservatism seems to continue to be central to the realignment of Southern whites' partisanship since the Civil Rights era". Valentino and Sears state that some "[o]ther scholars downplay the role of racial issues and prejudice even in contemporary racial politics". And that "the conventional wisdom about partisanship today seems to point
to divisions over the size of government (including taxes, social programs, and regulation), national security, and moral issues such as abortion and gay rights, with racial issues only one of numerous areas about which liberals and conservatives disagree, and far from the most important one at that".

Jeremy Mayer argues that scholars have given too much emphasis on the civil rights issue as it was not the only deciding factor for Southern white voters. Goldwater took positions on such issues as privatizing the Tennessee Valley Authority, abolishing Social Security and ending farm price supports that outraged many white Southerners who strongly supported these programs. Mayer states:

Political scientist Nelson W. Polsby argued that economic development was more central than racial desegregation in the evolution of the postwar South in Congress. In The End of Southern Exceptionalism: Class, Race, and Partisan Change in the Postwar South, University of Wisconsin political scientist Byron E. Shafer and University of British Columbia political scientist Richard Johnston developed Polsby's argument in greater depth. Using roll call analysis of voting patterns in the House of Representatives, they found that issues of desegregation and race were less important than issues of economics and social class when it came to the transformation of partisanship in the South.  This view is backed by Glenn Feldman who notes that the early narratives on the Southern realignment focused on the idea of appealing to racism.  This argument was first and thus took hold as the accepted narrative.

Gareth Davies argues that "[t]he scholarship of those who emphasize the southern strategizing Nixon is not so much wrong—it captures one side of the man—as it is unsophisticated and incomplete. Nixon and his enemies needed one another in order to get the job done". Lawrence McAndrews makes a similar argument, saying Nixon pursued a mixed strategy:

Historian Joan Hoff noted that in interviews with historians years later, Nixon denied that he ever practiced a Southern strategy. Harry Dent, one of Nixon's senior advisers on Southern politics, told Nixon privately in 1969 that the administration "has no Southern Strategy, but rather a national strategy which, for the first time in modern times, includes the South".

See also
 Bible Belt
 Lily-white movement
 Political culture of the United States
 Politics of the Southern United States
 Race (human categorization)
 Second Redemption
 White backlash

Notes

References

Further reading

 Aistrup, Joseph A. "Constituency diversity and party competition: A county and state level analysis." Political Research Quarterly 57#2 (2004): 267–81.
 Aistrup, Joseph A. The southern strategy revisited: Republican top-down advancement in the South (University Press of Kentucky, 2015).
 Aldrich, John H. "Southern Parties in State and Nation" Journal of Politics 62#3 (2000) pp. 643–70.
 Applebome, Peter. Dixie Rising: How the South is Shaping American Values, Politics, and Culture.
 Bass, Jack. The transformation of southern politics: Social change and political consequence since 1945 (University of Georgia Press, 1995).
 Black, Earl and Merle Black. The Rise of Southern Republicans (Harvard University Press, 2003).
 Brady, David, Benjamin Sosnaud, and Steven M. Frenk. "The shifting and diverging white working class in US presidential elections, 1972–2004." 'Social Science Research 38.1 (2009): 118–33.
 Brewer, Mark D., and Jeffrey M. Stonecash. "Class, race issues, and declining white support for the Democratic Party in the South." Political Behavior 23#2 (2001): 131–55.
 Bullock III, Charles S. and Mark J. Rozell, eds. The New Politics of the Old South: An Introduction to Southern Politics (5th ed. 2013).
 Carter, Dan T. From George Wallace to Newt Gingrich: Race in the Conservative Counterrevolution, 1963–1994.
 Carter, Dan T. The Politics of Rage: George Wallace, The Origins of the New Conservatism, and the Transformation of Southern Politics.
 Chappell, David L. A Stone of Hope: Prophetic Religion and the Death of Jim Crow.
 Davies, Gareth. "Richard Nixon and the Desegregation of Southern Schools." Journal of Policy History 19#04 (2007) pp. 367–94.
 Egerton, John. "A Mind to Stay Here: Closing Conference Comments on Southern Exceptionalism", Southern Spaces, 29 November 2006.
 Feldman, Glenn, ed. Painting Dixie Red: When, Where, Why, and How the South Became Republican  (UP of Florida, 2011) 386pp
 Frantz, Edward O. The Door of Hope: Republican Presidents and the First Southern Strategy, 1877–1933 (University Press of Florida, 2011).
 Havard, William C., ed. The Changing Politics of the South (Louisiana State University Press, 1972).
 Hill, John Paul. "Nixon's Southern Strategy Rebuffed: Senator Marlow W. Cook and the Defeat of Judge G. Harrold Carswell for the US Supreme Court." Register of the Kentucky Historical Society 112#4 (2014): 613–50.
 Inwood, Joshua F.J. "Neoliberal racism: the 'Southern Strategy' and the expanding geographies of white supremacy." Social & Cultural Geography 16#4 (2015) pp. 407–23.
 Kalk, Bruce H. The Origins of the Southern Strategy: Two-party Competition in South Carolina, 1950–1972 (Lexington Books, 2001).
 Kalk, Bruce H. "Wormley's Hotel Revisited: Richard Nixon's Southern Strategy and the End of the Second Reconstruction." North Carolina Historical Review (1994): 85–105. in JSTOR.
 Kalk, Bruce H. The Machiavellian nominations: Richard Nixon's Southern strategy and the struggle for the Supreme Court, 1968–70 (1992).
 Kruse, Kevin M. White Flight: Atlanta and the Making of Modern Conservatism.
 Lisio, Donald J. Hoover, Blacks, and Lily-Whites: A Study of Southern Strategies (UNC Press, 2012).
 Lublin, David. The Republican South: Democratization and Partisan Change (Princeton University Press, 2004).
 Maxwell, Angie and Todd Shields. The Long Southern Strategy: How Chasing White Voters in the South Changed American Politics (Oxford University Press, 2019).
 Olien, Roger M. From Token to Triumph: The Texas Republicans, 1920–1978 (SMU Press, 1982).
 Perlstein, Rick. Nixonland: The Rise of a President and the Fracturing of America (2009).
 Phillips, Kevin. The Emerging Republican Majority (1969).
 Boyd, James. "Nixon's Southern strategy 'It's All In the Charts'", New York Times, May 17, 1970.
 Shafer, Byron E., and Richard Johnston. The end of Southern exceptionalism: class, race, and partisan change in the postwar South (Harvard University Press, 2009).
 Shafer, Byron E., and Richard G.C. Johnston. "The transformation of southern politics revisited: The House of Representatives as a window." British Journal of Political Science 31#04 (2001): 601–25. online.
 Scher, Richard K. Politics in the New South: Republicanism, race and leadership in the twentieth century'' (1992).

History of racism in the United States
History of the Southern United States
New Right (United States)
Political campaign techniques
Politics of the Southern United States
Political terminology of the United States
Republican Party (United States)
Richard Nixon 1968 presidential campaign
Right-wing populism in the United States